Cantarella was a poison allegedly used by the Borgias during the papacy of Pope Alexander VI. It may have been identical with arsenic, sprinkled on food or in wine, in the shape of "a white powder with a pleasant taste". If it did exist, it left no trace in the works of contemporary writers.

References

Arsenic
House of Borgia
Poisons